Luis Daniel Rivera Filomeno is a Puerto Rican politician from the Popular Democratic Party (PPD). Rivera was elected to the Senate of Puerto Rico in 2012.

Rivera was born in Carolina. He has a Bachelor's degree in Political Science. Rivera has also worked with the Municipality of Carolina. He is married and has two children.

Rivera decided to run for a seat in the Senate of Puerto Rico under the Popular Democratic Party (PPD). After winning a spot on the 2012 primaries, he was elected on the general elections to represent the District of Carolina.

See also
25th Senate of Puerto Rico

References

Living people
People from Carolina, Puerto Rico
Members of the Senate of Puerto Rico
Year of birth missing (living people)